Leonard Arthur "Len" Herzenberg (November 5, 1931 – October 27, 2013) was an immunologist, geneticist and professor at Stanford University.  His contributions to the development of cell biology made it possible to sort viable cells by their specific properties.

Education
Herzenberg was born in New York City, U.S.A. He received his bachelor's degree in 1952 from Brooklyn College in biology and chemistry.  In 1955, he received his Ph.D. from California Institute of Technology in biochemistry with a specialization in immunology for studies on cytochrome in Neurospora.

Career
After school he was a postdoctoral fellow at the American Cancer Society, working in France at the Pasteur Institute. He returned to the United States in 1957 and worked for the National Institutes of Health as an officer in the Public Health Service department. He started working at Stanford in 1959. He eventually earned the title Professor of Genetics.

In 1970 Herzenberg developed the fluorescence-activated cell sorter (FACS) which revolutionized  immunology and cancer biology, and is the basis for purification of adult stem cells.

During a sabbatical in the laboratory of Cesar Milstein between 1976 and 1977, Herzenberg coined the term hybridoma for hybrid cells that result from the fusion of B cells and myeloma cells.

Personal life
Herzenberg and his wife, Leonore Herzenberg, ran the Herzenberg Laboratory at Stanford together  until his death. Their daughter, Jana Herzen, is a singer-songwriter and the founder of Motéma Music. He died on October 27, 2013, aged 81.

Awards and honours
Herzenberg received a range of honours and awards during his life including:
 1998 American Association of Immunologists Lifetime Achievement Award
 2002 Edwin F. Ullman Award, American Association of Clinical Chemistry
 2004 Special Novartis Prize for Immunology (the only winner of this award)
 2005 Abbott Laboratories Award in Clinical and Diagnostic Immunology, American Society for Microbiology
 2006 Kyoto award for his work in cell biology;
 2007 Ceppellini Award, International Foundation for Research in Experimental Medicine, with his wife Lee Herzenberg for "their internationally recognized contributions to medicine"
 2013 ABRF Annual Award for Outstanding Contributions to Biomolecular Technologies

References

External links
 "Leonard Arthur Herzenberg" Inamori Foundation Kyoto Award;
 ;
 Pincock, Stephen  (9 June 2006) "Herzenberg wins Kyoto Prize" The Scientist: Magazine of the Life Sciences 2006(June 9): ;
 "A Conversation with Leonard and Leonore Herzenberg" 

1931 births
Members of the United States National Academy of Sciences
2013 deaths
American immunologists
Jewish physicians
American geneticists
Jewish microbiologists
Jewish American scientists
Stanford University School of Medicine faculty
California Institute of Technology alumni
People from Stanford, California
Brooklyn College alumni
21st-century American Jews
Kyoto laureates in Advanced Technology